Flora Township may refer to:

 Flora Township, Boone County, Illinois
 Flora Township, Dickinson County, Kansas
 Flora Township, Renville County, Minnesota

Township name disambiguation pages